Football is the most popular sport in Germany. The German Football Association ( or ) is the sport's national governing body, with 6.6 million members (roughly eight percent of the population) organized in over 31,000 football clubs. There is a league system, with the Bundesliga, 2. Bundesliga and 3. Liga on top. The winner of the Bundesliga is crowned the German football champion. Additionally, there are national cup competitions, most notably the DFB-Pokal (German Cup) and DFL-Supercup (German Supercup).

The Germany national football team has won four FIFA World Cups (1954, 1974, 1990, 2014), being the joint-second most successful nation in the tournament only surpassed by Brazil. It also holds a record (tied with Spain) three UEFA European Championships (1972, 1980, 1996), and won the FIFA Confederations Cup in 2017..

The Germany women's national football team has won two FIFA Women's World Cups (2003, 2007) and a record eight UEFA European Women's Championships (1989, 1991, 1995, 1997, 2001, 2005, 2009, 2013), as well as a gold medal in the Summer Olympics in 2016. Germany is the only nation that has won both the men's and women's World Cup. No team has more combined men's and women's World Cup championships, and only the United States has won more combined men's and women's regional/continental championships (United States 12 in CONCACAF, Germany 11 in UEFA). Germany was the host of the 1974 and 2006 FIFA World Cup, UEFA Euro 1988, and the 2005 FIFA Confederations Cup. They also hosted the 1989, 1995 and 2001 UEFA European Women's Championship, and the 2011 FIFA Women's World Cup. Germany will host UEFA Euro 2024 after beating out rival Turkey by 8 votes (12–4).

History

Introduction to German football
The first football match arguably took place in Braunschweig in 1874. Two schoolteachers, August Hermann and Konrad Koch, initiated the first match after Hermann had obtained a round football from England. In 1875, Koch published the first German version of the rules of football, although Koch's version of the game still closely resembled Rugby football.

First football clubs
The Dresden English Football Club is considered the first modern football club in Germany. It was founded in 1874 by Englishmen living and working around Dresden. In the following 20 years the game achieved a growing popularity. Football clubs were founded in Berlin, Hamburg and Stuttgart.

Foundation To World War I
On 28 January 1900, representatives from 86 football clubs from German-speaking areas in and outside the German Empire met in the restaurant Mariengarten in Leipzig, founding the DFB. The founding meeting was led by E. J. Kirmse, chairman of the Leipziger Fussball Verband (Leipzig Football Association). Ferdinand Hueppe, representing the DFC Prag, was elected first president of the DFB.

Already some years before 1900, associations like the Bund Deutscher Fussballspieler or Deutscher Fussball und Cricket-Bund were founded, but they were limited to smaller areas of the German Empire, in those cases to areas around Berlin. The first championship beyond municipal areas was held in 1898 from the Verband Sueddeutscher Fussball-Vereine (Association of South German football clubs), later affiliated with the DFB.

The Germany national football team has represented Germany in international football competitions since 1908. It is controlled by the German Football Association (DFB), the domestic governing body of Germany's football in Germany.

Weimar Republic 

Germany national football team played its first post-WWI match on 27 June 1920 in Zürich against Switzerland, which the Swiss team won 1:4.

Club football was centered in the region of Franconia during the 1920s as 1. FC Nürnberg and SpVgg Fürth dominated the competition.

In 1919, the proletarian Arbeiter-Turnbund was renamed Arbeiter-Turn- und Sportbund (ATSB). The name change especially reflected the incorporation of football into the federation, which promoted leftist political views and attempted to break the monopolisation of football under the umbrella of the DFB.

Nazi Germany 

With the rise of Nazism, left-leaning sporting associations such as the ATSB and Rotsport were banned. Communist sporting officials such as Ernst Grube, Reichstag deputy and head of Rotsport, were murdered in concentration camps. The DFB integrated as Fachamt Reichsfußball into the National Socialist League of the Reich for Physical Exercise. From 1933 to 1945 the highest level of play in German football was organised in 16 Gauligen, whose winners qualified for the finals in the German championship, held at the end of season.

Inter-war period

After the war, Germany was occupied in three states. The DFB and its team continued in what was called West Germany, while the Saarland and East Germany fielded separate teams for some years.

East and West

The FIFA World Cup 1974 was staged in West Germany, and both German teams were drawn in the same group in the first round. Meeting on 22 June 1974 in a politically charged match in Hamburg, East Germany beat West Germany 1–0, on a goal by Jürgen Sparwasser. Both German teams advanced to the second round anyway. The GDR team was eliminated there, while the DFB team eventually went on to win the tournament.

Reunification
In the year of German reunification (1990), West Germany secured its third World Cup as West and East Germans celebrated together. The present-day Germany national team is identical to the team representing what was informally called West Germany from 1949 to 1990, as the German Football Association was again recognized by FIFA after WW2. Nothing changed in 1990 except enlarged membership due to the access of East German states and players, thus the continuity in the German logo and uniform style as well as references to Germany's four World Cup and three European Cup titles. Thus, all references to a "former West German team" are considered by many as false - according to the DFB, this team still exists, called Germany.

Germany's greatest triumphs since 1990 have been winning the 2014 World Championship in Brazil, and the 1996 European Championship secured in England with players from both the former West, including (Jürgen Klinsmann as captain) and East (Matthias Sammer) as anchor of the defence.

New millennium
The greatest success for German team in the new millennium has been their winning the 2014 FIFA World Cup. They had also finished in second place to Brazil at the 2002 World Cup in South Korea and Japan and second place at the 2008 European Championship. There was also a third place at the 2006 World Cup in Germany and in addition another third place at World Cup 2010. Germany's women have achieved even greater success, winning both the 2003 FIFA Women's World Cup in the US and the 2007 FIFA Women's World Cup in China.

German Football Association

The national association is the German Football Association (or Deutscher Fußball-Bund) headquartered in Frankfurt.

The DFB was founded in 1900 in Leipzig, by the representatives of 86 clubs. Today, the association has some 31,000 member clubs which field 170,000 teams with over 2 million players: these numbers include 870,000 female members and 8,600 women's teams. With over six million active and passive members, the DFB is the world's largest sports federation.

National team

Men's

The Germany national football team has represented Germany in international football competitions since 1908. It is controlled by the German Football Association (DFB), the governing body of football in Germany. They have won four FIFA World Cups and have been runners up on four occasions.

Since the 1954 World Cup, the Germany national team has been outfitted by the German firm adidas. For home games, the German team wears white jerseys, black shorts and white socks in honour of the Prussian colours. Along with black both red and gold, the other two colours of the German flag, have been included in the strip over the years.

Traditionally, the Germans have worn green jerseys, white shorts and green socks as their alternate uniform. In recent years, however, the Germans have changed their away uniform to grey in 2002–2003, black in 2004 and recently to red. The Germans wore red as their alternate colour in the 2006 World Cup.

The Germany national team during the 2006 World Cup was coached by former captain Jürgen Klinsmann. Since 12 July 2006, former Assistant Coach Joachim Löw has coached the national team. Its current captain is Bayern Munich goalkeeper Manuel Neuer.

Women's

The German women's national football team, also organised by the DFB, are two-time world champions, having won the FIFA Women's World Cup in 2003 under past coach Tina Theune-Meyer and 2007 FIFA Women's World Cup under current coach Silvia Neid. They are the first women's team to have successfully defended a World Cup. They have also won eight UEFA Women's Championships (1989, 1991, 1995, 1997, 2001, 2005, 2009, 2013), which includes six consecutive titles. Germany is the only nation to have won both the men's and women's World Cup and European Championship.

The Germany women's team are also the first to have won a World Cup at senior level, either for men or women, without conceding a single goal, having done so in 2007. Nadine Angerer was the goalkeeper who managed this feat.

Home stadiums
The national teams play in various stadiums throughout Germany. The cities of Düsseldorf, Munich, Dortmund and Berlin are some of the more popular locations.

Men's Honours

Major competitions 
FIFA World Cup
 Champions (4): 1954, 1974, 1990, 2014
 Runners-up (4): 1966, 1982, 1986, 2002
 Third place (4): 1934, 1970, 2006, 2010
 Fourth place (1): 1958

UEFA European Championship
 Champions (3): 1972, 1980, 1996
 Runners-up (3): 1976, 1992, 2008
 Third place (3): 1988, 2012, 2016

Summer Olympic Games
 Gold Medal (1): 1976
 Silver Medal (2): 1980, 2016
 Bronze Medal (3): 1964, 1972, 1988
 Fourth place (1): 1952

FIFA Confederations Cup
 Champions (1): 2017
 Third place (1): 2005

Women's Honours

Major competitions 
FIFA Women's World Cup
 Champions (2): 2003, 2007
 Runners-up (1): 1995
 Fourth place (2): 1991, 2015

UEFA Women's Championship
 Champions (8): 1989, 1991, 1995, 1997, 2001, 2005, 2009, 2013
 Runners-up (1): 2022
 Fourth place (1): 1993

Summer Olympic Games
 Gold Medal (1): 2016
 Bronze Medal (3): 2000, 2004, 2008

FIFA World Cup
The Germany national football team has won four FIFA World Cups and have been the runners up on four other occasions. The four World Cup championships are commemorated by the four stars above the Germany national team logo on the team's jerseys. Germany hosted the World Cups in 1974 and in 2006.

The women's national team has won two FIFA Women's World Cups, commemorated by two stars above the crest on their jerseys. Germany hosted the 2011 Women's World Cup.

FIFA World Cup 1954
The Wankdorf Stadion in Bern saw 60,000 people cram inside to watch the Final between West Germany and Hungary, a rematch of a first-round game, which Hungary had won 8–3. In response to his team's earlier thrashing at the hands of the Hungarians, legendary West German coach Sepp Herberger made key tactical adjustments in his team's lineup prior to the Final. Shortly before the match, it had started raining - in Germany this was dubbed "Fritz-Walter-Wetter" (Fritz Walter Weather) because the German team captain Fritz Walter was said to play his best in rainy weather.

The Final saw the legendary Ferenc Puskás playing even though he was not fully fit. Despite this he put his team ahead after only 6 minutes and, with Zoltán Czibor adding another two minutes later, it seemed destined that the pre-tournament favourites would take the title.

However, with a goal from Max Morlock on the tenth minute and Helmut Rahn on the nineteenth before halftime, the tide began to turn in the Germans' favor. The second half saw misses from the Hungarian team as well as a disallowed goal from Puskás with 2 minutes left.

Rahn then scored again to make the score 3–2. As he was scoring the goal, the popular German reporter Herbert Zimmermann gave the most famous German piece of commentary of all time - "Rahn schiesst - TOR!" ("Rahn shoots - GOAL!") - while the Hungarian reporter burst into tears. The game would become known as the "Das Wunder von Bern" (the "Miracle of Bern") in German lore and would be the basis for a successful movie released in 2003.

FIFA World Cup 1974
The FIFA World Cup 1974 competition was held in West Germany.

Led by legendary libero Franz Beckenbauer, keeper Sepp Maier, playmaker Paul Breitner, and strikers Uli Hoeneß and "Der Bomber" Gerd Müller (Germany's all-time leading scorer with 68 goals in 62 games), Germany won its second World Cup by defeating the Netherlands in the final, 2–1, behind goals by Breitner and Müller. The Final was famous for the battle between Kaiser Franz (Beckenbauer) and King Johann (Cruyff).

The tournament marked the first time that the current trophy, the FIFA World Cup, was awarded. The previous trophy, the Jules Rimet Trophy, was won for the third time by Brazil in 1970 and awarded permanently to the Brazilians.

FIFA World Cup 1990
In a tournament which included a memorable clash with rival the Netherlands, Germany defeated Argentina, 1–0, on an Andreas Brehme penalty kick, to win its third World Cup title. With its third title (and three second-place finishes), West Germany became the most successful World Cup nation for four years, until Brazil won their fourth championship in 1994. West German team manager Franz Beckenbauer became the second footballer, after Mario Zagallo of Brazil, to become World Champion as a player (in 1974) and as team manager. In doing so, Beckenbauer also became the first captain of a winning team to later manage a winning squad.

FIFA Women's World Cup 2003
The 2003 FIFA Women's World Cup was held in the United States (changed from China due to the SARS epidemic) and won by Germany, who defeated Sweden by 2–1 in extra time. Earlier in the semifinals they had disposed of the defending champions and hosts, the United States, 3–0.

FIFA World Cup 2006

Germany hosted the 2006 FIFA World Cup. Thirty-two nations competed in the tournament, with matches played in a dozen cities ranging from Hamburg in the north to Munich in the south; Leipzig was the only former East city to hold matches (the matches at Berlin were held at former West Berliner territory). The opening match (Germany vs Costa Rica) was held on 9 June in the Allianz Arena in Munich, with Germany defeating Costa Rica 4–2. The final match took place in Olympiastadion Berlin one month later between Italy and France. The match was drawn 1–1 at full-time and after extra time. Zinedine Zidane was controversially sent off for headbutting Italy's Marco Materazzi with 10 minutes to go before the match went into penalties. France lost to Italy in the shootout 5–3.

Germany defeated Portugal 3–1 in the third place play off at the Gottlieb-Daimler-Stadion in Stuttgart on 8 July. Miroslav Klose won the Golden Boot for the highest goalscorer of the tournament with 5 goals. Lukas Podolski received the Best Young Player Award.

FIFA Women's World Cup 2007
The 2007 FIFA Women's World Cup was held in China and won by Germany, who became the first women's team to successfully defend the title. In the opening match in Shanghai, Germany beat Argentina by a record 11–0. Nadine Angerer, the key goalkeeper, went unbeaten the entire tournament. In the final at Shanghai, Germany beat Brazil, 2–0.

Birgit Prinz became the all-time top World Cup goalscorer with 14 goals total.

FIFA World Cup 2010
Germany finished third for the second consecutive time, behind Spain and the Netherlands. Germany was the team that scored the most goals in the FIFA World Cup 2010, with three 4-goal hauls. They lost to only two teams, Serbia and Spain. Thomas Müller won the Golden Shoe and Best Young Player award.

FIFA Women's World Cup 2011
The 2011 FIFA Women's World Cup was held in Germany. The competition kicked off with two matches on 26 June—the first in Sinsheim pitting France and Nigeria, followed by the official opening match in Berlin featuring Germany and Canada. Germany went on to win Group A without dropping a point, but lost in the quarterfinals to eventual champion Japan.

FIFA World Cup 2014
Germany emerged champions of the 2014 World Cup competition, defeating Argentina 1–0 thanks to a memorable goal by 22-year-old Mario Götze. In the run-up to the finals, Germany routed Brazil 7–1 in their semi-final match, breaking several World Cup records. Miroslav Klose also scored his 16th World Cup goal in this match to become the highest scoring player in World Cup history.

FIFA Women's World Cup 2015
The 2015 FIFA Women's World Cup was held in Canada. Germany won Group B on goal difference over Norway. In the knockout rounds, they defeated Sweden in the round of 16 and France in the quarterfinals. They would ultimately be eliminated for the second straight World Cup by the eventual champion, dropping their semifinal to the United States. In the third-place game, Germany lost to England 1–0 on an extra-time penalty.

Germany's Célia Šašić won the tournament's Golden Boot. Šašić and the USA's Carli Lloyd had 6 goals and were level on the first tiebreaker of assists, with 1 each; Šašić won on the second tiebreaker of fewer minutes played.

UEFA European Championship
Germany have won three European Championship (1972, 1980 and 1996). The German team also placed second in the 1976, 1992 and 2008 championships.

Euro 1972
In Euro 1972, a young West German team that would go on to win the World Cup two years later captured the first of its three European Cup titles. In the two-leg quarter-finals, Germany first crushed England, 3–1, in Wembley Stadium on 29 April 1972, then closed the door by earning a 0–0 draw in Berlin. The Germans then advanced to the finals in Belgium, where they defeated the host nation, 2–1, in the semifinal and the Soviet Union, 3–0, in the final to capture their first major championship since the Miracle of Bern.

"This is the best team we ever had," stated former coach Helmut Schön in the hour of his triumph. In admiration of the German effort, the French L’Equipe wrote: "Brussels witnessed the rehabilitation of attacking football." The Times noted: "Germany has the most talented football team on the continent."

Euro 1980
Only 8 years passed before the Germans secured their next title. After defeating Czechoslovakia, Netherlands, and Greece in the opening round, Germany got past Belgium, 2–1, in the final through two goals by Horst Hrubesch. This tournament would be the first of many for midfielder Lothar Matthäus, who would retire after Euro 2000 as Germany's most capped (experienced) player with 150 national team appearances.

Euro 1996
In 1996, Germany won perhaps its most memorable European Championship and its first major championship since reunification. Led by captain Jürgen Klinsmann on offense and Matthias Sammer on defense, the Germans easily defeated the Czech Republic, 2–0, and Russia, 3–0, in the first round. A hard-fought 0–0 draw against Italy completed the first round and saw Germany through to the quarterfinals, where it defeated Croatia 2–1.

This victory set the stage for a classic battle against England, again in Wembley Stadium, in the tournament semifinals. After England jumped in front with a goal in the third minute, the Germans - playing without injured captain Klinsmann - fought back and equalized behind a Stefan Kuntz goal in the 16. minute. Both teams fought through the remainder of regulation and two sudden-death 15-minute overtime periods without scoring, leading to a dramatic penalty kick shootout. In the shootout, German keeper Andreas Köpke held England's sixth attempt, allowing Andreas Möller to stun the Wembley faithful and send Germany through to the final.

In the final, Germany fell behind the same Czech squad it had defeated earlier in the tournament on a controversial penalty kick decision. Nonetheless, the Germans displayed their usual fighting spirit and tied the game on substitute Oliver Bierhoff's 73. minute header. Regulation ended in a 1–1 tie. Five minutes into the first sudden-death overtime, it was again Oliver Bierhoff who led the Germans to victory with his historic golden goal. Largely because of his outstanding defensive efforts in the tournament, Matthias Sammer was voted "Europe's Player of the Year" after the finals.

Euro 2024
In 2024, Germany will host the UEFA Euro 2024, it will be taking place in 10 cities, Berlin, Cologne, Dortmund, Düsseldorf, Frankfurt, Gelsenkirchen, Hamburg, Leipzig, Munich and Stuttgart. The opening match will take place at the Allianz Arena in Munich and the final will take place at the Olympiastadion in Berlin.

Football competitions

Bundesliga

The country's premier football competition is the 18-team Bundesliga. Bayern Munich has won a record of 31 Bundesliga championships since the formation of the league in 1963. Hamburger SV was the only team to have played in every Bundesliga season until the 2017–18 season when they were relegated for the first time in club history. The second-tier league is known as the 2. Bundesliga. A 3. Liga, run directly by the DFB instead of the DFB-affiliated German Football League (DFL, from the German Deutsche Fußball Liga) which operates the two Bundesligen, was introduced in 2008.

German Cup
The German Cup (German: "DFB-Pokal", Deutscher Fußball Bund-Pokal) is a national football tournament held annually since 1952. It is the second most important national title in German football after the Bundesliga championship.

Each football club which participates in the German football league system is entitled to enter the tournament. The clubs of the lower leagues play in regional qualification rounds, with the winners joining the teams of the Bundesliga and 2. Bundesliga in the main round of the tournament in the following year. Each elimination is determined by a single game held on the ground of one of the two participating teams. Since 1985 the final has been held each year at the Olympic Stadium in Berlin. Bayern Munich has won the cup a record 20 times.

The Tschammer-Pokal was the predecessor to today's cup competition. It was introduced in 1934–35 and contested until 1944.

Divided after World War II, Germany had two cup competitions with East German sides competing for the East German Cup (German: "FDGB-Pokal", Freier Deutscher Gewerkschaftsbund-Pokal or Free German Trade Union Federation Cup). Introduced in 1949, the cup was contested annually until 1991 when the tournament was ended in the wake of German re-unification and the merger of the football leagues of the two Germanys.

Participation in European competition
Under current co-efficient rankings, Germany is guaranteed at least four UEFA Champions League spots, two UEFA Europa League spots and one UEFA Europa Conference League spot. Clubs finishing first, second, third and fourth in the Bundesliga are put into the group stage of the Champions League. The fifth-place finisher enters the group stage of the Europa League, while the team in sixth enters the play-off round of the Europa Conference League. The winners of the DFB-Pokal also enter the group stage of the Europa League. However, if the winner of the Cup has already been granted a place in the Champions League through league standings, then the team placed seventh in the Bundesliga is granted a place in the play-off round of the Europa Conference League.

Foreign players in Germany

There are many foreign football players in the German professional football leagues. In November 2009, there were 249 foreign players in the 1. Bundesliga, or 45% of all players. In the 2. Bundesliga, there are 145 foreign players, with a ratio of 31%. In the 3. Liga, the foreigner percentage is 15%.

Football on TV

Record viewership

FIFA Men's World Cup on TV

FIFA Women's World Cup on TV

+60,000-capacity German football stadiums

See also
 Women's football in Germany
 East Germany national football team 
 Football in Berlin
 Football in Munich

References

External links
 German Football Association 
 Fussball.de